Ellis Roderick Dungan (May 11, 1909 – December 1, 2001) was an American film director, who was well known for working in Indian films, predominantly in Tamil cinema, from 1936 to 1950. He was an alumnus of the University of Southern California and moved to India in 1935. During his film career in South India, Dungan directed the debut films of several popular Tamil film actors, such as M. G. Ramachandran in Sathi Leelavathi, T. S. Balaiya, Kali N. Ratnam and N. S. Krishnan.

Biography

Early life
An Irish-American, Dungan was born in Barton, Ohio. on May 11, 1909. He attended St. Clairsville High School in St. Clairsville, where he played quarterback on the school football team. He bought his first box camera to take pictures for the school yearbook, for which he was editor-in-chief. He later enrolled at the University of Southern California in 1932 in the newly established Cinematography & Motion Picture Production Department.

Career

In 1935, he came to India with his college mate Michael Ormalev at the invitation of another USC student - Manik Lal Tandon of Bombay. Tandon's family was then planning to enter the film industry. When those plans did not take off, Tandon invited them to Calcutta where he was directing the Tamil film Nandanar. There Tandon introduced them to A. N. Marudhachalam Chettiar, a film producer who was making the film Sathi Leelavathi and recommended Dungan be hired to direct the film as he himself was busy directing Nandanar. Thus Dungan made his directing debut with Sathi Leelavathi which was also the first film of future-Chief Minister of Tamil Nadu, M. G. Ramachandran. During 1936-50, Dungan made a number of Tamil films and one Hindi film - Meera (1947). Dungan had no knowledge of Indian languages, a problem which never affected his career as a director of films in Indian languages, especially Tamil. He introduced many new techniques to Indian cinema despite the technical limitations of that period. Many of his movies were based on the mythical characters of the Hindu religion and he had to shoot them in Hindu temples where non-Hindus were not allowed in those days. Dungan filmed his movies in the temples by passing himself off as a Kashmiri pundit. Dungan is credited with introducing modern make-up, the mobile camera and cabaret dance numbers to Tamil Cinema and moving it away from the influence of stage plays. For his introduction of intimate love scenes in Ponmudi (1950), Dungan was criticized by the press for introducing "vulgar" scenes and for "corrupting the population with American ways".

His last Tamil film was Manthiri Kumari in 1950. He returned to America and settled in Wheeling, West Virginia in 1958. There he started his company - "Ellis Dungan productions" and for the next thirty years made documentary movies for the Hollywood producer Duke Goldstone.

Death
Dungan died in Wheeling on December 1, 2001 at the age of 92.

Legacy 
Dungan is credited with having revolutionized Indian cinema and introduced western innovations. In 2013, American film maker Karan Bali made a one-hour documentary on Dungan titled An American in Madras by consulting West Virginia State Archives and interviewing people who had known Dungan.

Filmography

Tamil 
 Bhakta Nandanar (1935) (uncredited)
 Sathi Leelavathi (1936)
 Seemanthini (1936)
 Iru Sahodarargal (1936)
 Ambikapathy (1937)
 Surya Puthri (1941)
 Sakuntalai (1940)
 Kalamegam (1940)
 Daasi Penn (1943)
 Valmiki (1945)
 Returning Soldier (1945)
 Meera (1945)
 Ponmudi (1950)
 Manthiri Kumari (1950)

Hindi
 Meera (1947)

English
 The Jungle (1952)
 Smilin' Ed's Gang (1951–1954) (TV show)
 Andy's Gang (1955–1960) (TV show)
 Harry Black and the Tiger (1958)
 Wheeling 1959: Wheels to Progress (1959)
 The Big Hunt (1959)
 Tarzan Goes to India (1962) (as second unit producer)
 For Liberty and Union (1977)
 Fox - Architect of the United States First Navy (1987)

Bibliography
 A Guide to Adventure - An Autobiography (with Barbara Diane Smik), Pittsburg: Dorrance Publishing Co. (2002)

References

External links 
 
 Entry in the Wheeling Hall of Fame
 NYT blog post on Ellis R. Dungan

1909 births
2001 deaths
Tamil film directors
USC School of Cinematic Arts alumni
American people of Irish descent
Hindi-language film directors
Film directors from Ohio
Film directors from West Virginia
People from Wheeling, West Virginia